When the Bough Breaks is the second solo album from Black Sabbath drummer Bill Ward. It was originally released on April 27, 1997, on Cleopatra Records.

Track listing
"Hate" – 5:00
"Children Killing Children" – 3:51
"Growth" – 5:45
"When I was a Child" – 4:54
"Please Help Mommy (She's a Junkie)" – 6:40
"Shine" – 5:06
"Step Lightly (On the Grass)" – 5:59
"Love & Innocence" – 1:00
"Animals" – 6:32
"Nighthawks Stars & Pines" – 6:45
"Try Life" – 5:35
"When the Bough Breaks" – 9:45

CD Cleopatra CL9981 (US 1997)

Musicians

Bill Ward - vocals, lyrics, musical arrangements
Keith Lynch - guitars
Paul Ill - bass, double bass, synthesizer, tape loops
Ronnie Ciago - drums

Cover art and reprint issues

As originally released, this album featured cover art that had two roses on it. After it was released, Bill Ward (as with Ward One, his first solo album) stated on his website that the released cover art was not the correct one that was intended to be released. Additionally, the liner notes for the original printing had lyrics that were so small, most people needed a magnifying glass to read them.  This was eventually corrected in 2000 when the version of the album with Bill on the cover from the 70's was released. The album was later on released in a special digipak style of case, but this was later said to be released prematurely, and was withdrawn.

References

External links
When the Bough Breaks at Bill Ward's site
When the Bough Breaks at Black Sabbath Online

Bill Ward (musician) albums
Black Sabbath
1997 albums
Cleopatra Records albums